Pectoral muscles are the muscles of the human chest connecting to the upper arm.

Pectoral muscles may also refer to:

 Pectoral muscles (cat), various muscles of the domestic cat
 Muscles in the thorax or chest of any animal species
 Muscles on the sides of fish; see Pectoral fin

See also
 Pectoral (disambiguation)